Rio Grande is a river flowing to the Gulf of Mexico, forming a part of the Mexican-United States border.

Rio Grande may also refer to:

Rivers

Argentina
 Río Grande (Mendoza), a tributary of Colorado Rivere in Argentina

Bolivia
 Río Grande (Bolivia), a tributary of the Mamoré River

Brazil
 Rio Grande (Bahia), a tributary of the São Francisco River
 Rio Grande (Dois Rios), a tributary of the Dois Rios River in Rio de Janeiro
 Rio Grande (Paraná River tributary), a tributary of the Paraná River
 Rio Grande (State of Paraná), a tributary of the Ribeira River

Philippines
 Rio Grande de Cagayan, a river in the Cagayan Province
 Rio Grande de Mindanao, a river in the Mindanao
 Rio Grande de Pampanga, a river in Central Luzon

Other rivers alphabetically

 :es:Río Grande (Antioquia), a river in the department of Antioquia, Colombia
 Rio Grande (Jamaica), a major river of Portland Parish, Jamaica
 Rio Grande (Panama), Coclé Province, Panama
 Río Grande (Puerto Rico), a river in Puerto Rico
 Río Grande (Lugo), a river in the province of Lugo, Spain
 Río Grande, Thujsa Jawira, Ingenio or Llink'i, a river in the La Paz Department, Bolivia
 Río Grande (Tierra del Fuego), a river in Chile and Argentina that flows to the Atlantic Ocean

Cities and political divisions

Argentina
 Río Grande, Tierra del Fuego

Brazil
 Rio Grande, Minas Gerais
 Rio Grande, Rio de Janeiro
 Rio Grande, Rio Grande do Sul

Mexico
 Rio Grande, Jalisco
 Río Grande Municipality, Zacatecas

Puerto Rico
 Río Grande, Puerto Rico, a municipality
 Río Grande, Aguada, Puerto Rico, a barrio
 Río Grande, Jayuya, Puerto Rico, a barrio
 Río Grande, Morovis, Puerto Rico, a barrio 
 Río Grande barrio-pueblo, barrio referred to as "Pueblo" of Río Grande municipality in Puerto Rico
 Río Grande, Rincón, Puerto Rico, a barrio

United States
 Rio Grande, New Jersey
 Rio Grande, Ohio
 Rio Grande County, Colorado
 Rio Grande City, Texas

Other places
 Río Grande Department, Tierra del Fuego Province
 Río Grande, Tierra del Fuego, Argentina
 Río Grande, Dominican Republic
 Rio Grande, South Caribbean Coast Autonomous Region, Nicaragua
 Río Grande, Veraguas, Panama
 Republic of the Rio Grande, a republic in modern Mexico and Texas that lasted less than a year in 1840.

Arts and entertainment
 Rio Grande (1920 film), an American silent western film
 Rio Grande (1938 film), an American western with Charles Starrett
 Rio Grande (1949 film), an American western starring Sunset Carson
 Rio Grande (1950 film), an American western directed by John Ford
 "Rio Grande" (shanty), a nineteenth-century Anglo-American sea shanty
 Rio Grande, 1957 musical composition by Morton Gould
 The Rio Grande (Lambert), 1927 work for alto, piano, chorus and orchestra by Constant Lambert
 "Rio Grande" (song), a suite composed by Brian Wilson
 Rio Grande, 1994 album by Eddy Mitchell, album of the year at Victoires de la Musique

Others
 Rio Grande Gorge, a geological feature in northern New Mexico
 Rio Grande Gorge Bridge
 Rio Grande rift, a continental rift zone that separates the Colorado Plateau from the interior of the North American craton, US
 Rio Grande Trail, a proposed long distance trail along the Rio Grande New Mexico, US
 Rio Grande Hydroelectric Complex, a pumped-storage power station in Argentina
 Sport Club Rio Grande, a Brazilian football club
 University of Rio Grande, in Rio Grande, Ohio, US
 Federal University of Rio Grande Foundation, in Rio Grande, Rio Grande do Sul, Brazil
 Rio Grande Pickups, a brand of guitar pickups
 Rio Grande Games, a board games publisher
 , a Panamanian cargo ship
 Brazilian monitor Rio Grande, a shallow draught armoured river vessel
 Rio Grande Project, a United States Bureau of Reclamation irrigation, hydroelectricity, flood control, and interbasin water transfer project serving the upper Rio Grande basin
 The Denver and Rio Grande Western Railroad, a now defunct Class I railroad in the western United States

See also
 Rio Grande Bridge at Radium Springs, New Mexico
 Rio Grande Detention Center, Laredo, Texas
 Río Grande District (disambiguation)
 Río Grande de Lipez, a river in Potosi Department, Bolivia
 Río Grande de Tarija, a tributary of the Bermejo River in Bolivia
 Río Grande de San Miguel, a river in El Salvador
 Río Grande de Zacapa, a river in eastern Guatemala
 Río Grande de Santiago, a river in Mexico
 Río Grande de Matagalpa, a river in eastern Nicaragua
 Rio Grande de Buba, an estuary in Guinea-Bissau
 Rio Grande da Serra, São Paulo, Brazil, a municipality
 Rio Grande do Norte, a Brazilian state
 Rio Grande do Piauí, Piauí, Brazil, a municipality
 Rio Grande do Sul, a Brazilian state
 Rio Grand, a country music group
 Grande River (disambiguation)
 Grand River (disambiguation)
 Middle Rio Grande (disambiguation)